The Girls' Singles tournament of the 2012 Asian Junior Badminton Championships was held from July 3–7 in Gimcheon, South Korea. The defending champion of the last edition was Sun Yu from China. The first seeded Pusarla Venkata Sindhu of India emerged as the champion after beat the second seeded Nozomi Okuhara of Japan in the finals with the score 18–21, 21–17, 22–20.

Seeded

  Pusarla Venkata Sindhu (champion)
  Nozomi Okuhara (final)
  Busanan Ongbumrungphan (semi-final)
  Le Thu Huyen (third round)
  Park So-young (withdrew)
  Sun Yu (quarter-final)
  Sarita Suwanakitborihan (second round)
  Lim Yin Fun (third round)

Draw

Finals

Top Half

Section 1

Section 2

Section 3

Section 4

Bottom Half

Section 5

Section 6

Section 7

Section 8

References

External links 
Main Draw

2012 Asian Junior Badminton Championships
Junior